The 1982 Greenlandic European Communities membership referendum was a referendum that took place on 23 February 1982, over whether Greenland should continue to be a member of the European Communities (EC).

Greenland had joined the EC in 1973 when Denmark joined, even though a majority of 70% of the Greenlandic votes  in the Danish EC referendum held in 1972 had been against membership. In the spring of 1981, after Greenlandic home rule had been established in 1979 and the eurosceptic party Siumut won the 1979 election, the Parliament of Greenland agreed to hold a referendum on its continued membership. The result of the referendum was a majority in favour of leaving the EC, and this was enacted by the Greenland Treaty, which allowed the EC to keep its fishing rights. Greenland continues to be considered one of the Overseas Countries and Territories of the EU, giving it a special relationship with the Union.

Results

See also

 Greenland–European Union relations
 Greenland (European Parliament constituency)
 Withdrawal of Greenland from the European Communities

References

Greenland
Referendums in Greenland
1982 in Greenland
1982 in international relations
1982 in the European Economic Community
Referendums related to the European Union
Withdrawal from the European Union
February 1982 events in Europe
Greenland–European Union relations
February 1982 events in North America